Saichon Konjen (born 30 March 1983) is a Paralympian athlete from Thailand competing mainly in category T54 sprint events.

Biography
He competed in the 2008 Summer Paralympics in Beijing, China.  There he won a silver medal in the men's 100 metres – T54 event, a silver medal in the men's 200 metres – T54 event, a silver medal in the men's 4 x 100 metre relay – T53-54 event, a silver medal in the men's 4 x 400 metre relay – T53-54 event and a bronze medal in the men's 400 metres – T54 event.

Notes

External links
 

1983 births
Living people
Saichon Konjen
Athletes (track and field) at the 2008 Summer Paralympics
Saichon Konjen
Saichon Konjen
Medalists at the 2008 Summer Paralympics
Medalists at the 2012 Summer Paralympics
Medalists at the 2016 Summer Paralympics
Medalists at the 2020 Summer Paralympics
Athletes (track and field) at the 2012 Summer Paralympics
Athletes (track and field) at the 2016 Summer Paralympics
Athletes (track and field) at the 2020 Summer Paralympics
Paralympic medalists in athletics (track and field)
Medalists at the 2018 Asian Para Games